Horace Valentine Jenkin (14 February 1893 – 17 January 1985) was an Australian rules footballer who played with Fitzroy in the VFL.

A defender, Jenkin was a member of Fitzroy premiership teams in 1916 and 1922. He started his career at full forward but played his best football as a defender, winning the club's best and fairest award in 1926.

References

External links 
 
 

1893 births
Australian rules footballers from Melbourne
Mitchell Medal winners
Fitzroy Football Club players
Fitzroy Football Club Premiership players
1985 deaths
Two-time VFL/AFL Premiership players
People from Collingwood, Victoria